Daisy Florence Dunn is an English author and classicist.

Early life and education
Daisy Dunn was born in London and attended Ibstock Place School in Southwest London and The Lady Eleanor Holles School in Hampton on an academic scholarship. She read Classics at St Hilda's College, Oxford, and won a scholarship to study for an MA in the History of Art at the Courtauld Institute, London, specialising in Titian, Venice and Renaissance Europe. She was awarded a PhD in Classics and Art History from University College London with a thesis exploring ekphrasis in Greek and Latin poetry and sixteenth-century Italian painting. She was long-listed in 2015 for the international Notting Hill Editions Prize for the essay "An Unlikely Friendship".

Career
In 2016 she published her first two books, a biography of the Latin love poet Catullus and a new translation of his poems. The biography, entitled Catullus' Bedspread, received endorsements from Boris Johnson, Robert Harris and Tom Holland and was described as a "superb portrait" in The Sunday Times. Dunn's translation of one of Catullus' expletives resulted in a series of letters in The Times Literary Supplement and an article in The Times. In a 2016 article in The Guardian Simon Schama included Dunn in his list of leading female historians.

Dunn's 2019 dual biography of Pliny the Elder and Pliny the Younger, In the Shadow Vesuvius: A Life of Pliny, published as The Shadow of Vesuvius in the US, was a New York Times Editor's Choice, a Waterstones Best History Book of 2019, and a Book of the Year in several publications. Dunn was interviewed ahead of its release by The Sunday Times and by Dan Snow for his podcast HistoryHit.

Also in 2019, Dunn published an anthology of ancient stories in English translation, Of Gods and Men: 100 Stories from Ancient Greece and Rome, for which she was interviewed by Paul Ross on TalkRadio. A month later, she released Homer, part of a new "expert" series of Ladybird books.

Dunn is a regular commentator, critic and columnist, writing for The Spectator, The Daily Telegraph and Literary Review, among other publications. She has contributed to BBC Radio 4, the BBC World Service, TalkRadio, BBC.com (Culture) and BBC 2, for which she participated in the 2016 Christmas University Challenge for notable alumni, with her team winning the series. In 2018 and 2019 she presented two short films on Latin phrases and Ancient Wisdom for BBC Ideas.

In 2020, Dunn was awarded the Classical Association Prize, which recognises efforts to bring the classics to public attention.

Dunn's sixth book, Not Far From Brideshead: Oxford Between the Wars, a group biography of the classicists Maurice Bowra, E. R. Dodds and Gilbert Murray, was published in March 2022. In The Times, Laura Freeman wrote of Dunn's "gift for making the arcane accessible and the forbidding more friendly" and the book as being "a love letter to learning". It was described by Leo Robson in the New Statesman as "Lucid, agile, juicy, nuanced". It was listed as a book of the year by Waterstones, The Independent, and The Daily Telegraph.

Works 
Dunn is the author of:

Catullus' Bedspread: The Life of Rome's Most Erotic Poet (HarperCollins/Harper Press, 2016) (UK Hardback  and US Hardback )
The Poems of Catullus: A New Translation (HarperCollins, 2016) (UK Paperback) 
In the Shadow of Vesuvius: A Life of Pliny (William Collins, 2019)  (US title: The Shadow of Vesuvius: A Life of Pliny (Liveright, 2019) )
Of Gods and Men: 100 Stories from Ancient Greece and Rome (Head of Zeus, 2019) 
Homer illus. Angelo Rinaldi (Ladybird Books, Michael Joseph, 2019) ISBN 978-0718188283
Not Far From Brideshead: Oxford Between the Wars (Weidenfeld & Nicolson, 2022) ISBN 978-1474615570

References

Writers from London
Living people
21st-century English writers
People educated at Lady Eleanor Holles School
Alumni of the University of Oxford
Alumni of University College London
People educated at Ibstock Place School
Year of birth missing (living people)